Sylwia Gawlikowska (born 25 February 1983, in Warsaw) is a Polish modern pentathlete. At the 2012 Summer Olympics, she competed in the women's competition, finishing in 13th place.

References

External links
 

Polish female modern pentathletes
Living people
Olympic modern pentathletes of Poland
Modern pentathletes at the 2004 Summer Olympics
Modern pentathletes at the 2008 Summer Olympics
Modern pentathletes at the 2012 Summer Olympics
1983 births
Sportspeople from Warsaw
World Modern Pentathlon Championships medalists